Béla (Serbian or Slovak variants are Бeлa, Bela or Belo) is a common Hungarian male given name. Its most likely etymology is from old Hungarian bél ("heart; insides" in Old Hungarian and "intestines" in modern Hungarian; in both the symbolism is "guts" i.e. bravery and character). Other possible etymological source is a Turkic word boila/boyla – "noble, distinguished" (which was a title of high nobility among the Bulgars and Göktürks), or a variant of Ábel.

Due to fame and importance of the saint Adalbert of Prague (~956–997) for early mediaeval Hungarian, Czech and Polish cultural history, the name Béla have been artificially assigned to Germanic name Adalbert ("noble bright") and Slavonic name Vojtěch/Wojciech ("consolator of troops"), although among these names there isn't any linguistic relationship.

People
Béla of Hungary
Béla I of Hungary (1020–1063), King of Hungary
Béla II of Hungary (1109–1141), King of Hungary and Croatia
Béla III of Hungary (1148–1196), King of Hungary and Croatia
Béla IV of Hungary (1206–1270), King of Hungary and Croatia
Béla V of Hungary (Otto III of Bavaria; 1261–1312), Duke of Lower Bavaria and King of Hungary and Croatia
Béla of Macsó (1243–1272), Duke of Macsó and Bosnia
Bela of Saint Omer (?–1258), French knight, Lord of one half of Thebes
Bela of Britonia (fl. 675), Galician clergyman, Bishop of Britonia
Béla Nagy Abodi (1918–2012), Hungarian painter
Béla Apáti Abkarovics (1888–1957), Hungarian painter and graphic artist
Béla Bacsó (disambiguation)
Béla Bacsó (1891–1920) Hungarian journalist and writer
Béla Bacsó (1952) aesthete
Béla Bácskai (1912–1994), Hungarian field hockey player
Béla Bakosi (born 1957), Hungarian triple jumper
Béla Balázs (1884–1949), Hungarian film critic, writer and poet
Béla Balogh (1885–1945), Hungarian film director
Béla Balogh (born 1984), Hungarian footballer
Béla Bánáthy (disambiguation)
Béla H. Bánáthy (1919–2003), American linguist and systems scientist
Béla A. Bánáthy (born 1943), American systems scientist
Béla Bánhidy (1836–1890), Hungarian politician
Béla Barabás (1855–1934), Hungarian politician, jurist and author
Béla Barényi (1907–1997), Hungarian-Austrian engineer
Béla Bartalos (born 1948), Hungarian handball player
Béla Bartók (1881–1945), Hungarian composer and pianist
Béla Bay (1907–1999), Hungarian fencer
Béla Békessy (1875–1916), Hungarian fencer
Béla Belicza, Hungarian sprint canoer
Béla Berger (1931–2005), Hungarian-Australian chess player
Béla Bicsérdy (1872–1951), Hungarian alternative medicine advocate, lecturer and author
Béla Biszku (born 1921), Hungarian politician
Béla Bodó (born 1959), Hungarian hurdler
Béla Bodonyi (born 1956), Hungarian footballer
Béla Bollobás (born 1943), Hungarian-British mathematician
Bela Borsodi, Austrian photographer
Béla Bugár (born 1958), Slovak politician
Bela Čikoš Sesija (1864–1931), Croatian painter
Béla Csécsei (1952–2012), Hungarian educator and politician
Béla Czóbel (1883–1976), Hungarian painter
Béla Dankó (born 1969), Hungarian politician
Béla von Darányi (1874–?), Hungarian sports shooter
Béla Drahos (born 1955), Hungarian conductor and flautist
Béla Egresi (1922–1999), Hungarian footballer
Béla Ernyey (born 1942), Hungarian actor
Béla Fleck (born 1958), American banjo player
Béla Gaál (1893–1945), Hungarian film director
Béla Glattfelder (born 1967), Hungarian politician
Béla Goldoványi (1925–1972), Hungarian sprinter
Béla Grunberger (1903–2005), French psychologist
Béla Guttmann (1899–1981), Hungarian footballer and coach
Béla Gyarmati (born 1942), Hungarian fencer
Béla Hamvas (1897–1968), Hungarian writer, philosopher, and social critic
Béla Háray (1915–1988), Hungarian ice hockey and field hockey player
Béla Hatvany (born 1938), American computer scientist, inventor and entrepreneur
Bela S. Huntington (1858–1934), American lawyer and politician
Béla Illés (1895–1974), Hungarian writer and journalist
Béla Illés (born 1968), Hungarian footballer
Béla Imrédy (1891–1946), Hungarian politician
Béla Ivády (1873–1962), Hungarian politician
Béla Iványi-Grünwald (1867–1940), Hungarian painter
Béla Jankovich (1865–1939), Hungarian politician
Béla Tibor Jeszenszky (1962–2008), Hungarian singer
Béla Juhász (1921–2002), Hungarian long-distance runner
Béla Julesz (1928–2003), Hungarian neuroscientist
Béla Jurcsek (1893–1945), Hungarian politician
Béla Kádár (1877–1956), Hungarian painter
Béla Károlyi (born 1942), Romanian gymnastics coach
Béla Kárpáti (1929–2003), Hungarian footballer
Béla Katona (born 1944), Hungarian politician
Béla Katzirz (born 1953), Hungarian footballer
Béla von Kehrling (1891–1937), Hungarian tennis, table tennis, football and ice-hockey player and bobsledder
Béla Kéler (1820–1882), Hungarian composer and conductor
Béla Kerékjártó (1898–1946), Hungarian mathematician
Béla Király (1912–2009), Hungarian military officer, politician and historian
Béla Kiss (1877–?), Hungarian serial killer
Béla Komjádi (1892–1933, Hungarian water polo player and coach
Béla Kondor (1931–1972), Hungarian artist and author
Béla Kontuly (1904–1983), Hungarian painter and art teacher
Béla Köpeczi (1921–2010), Hungarian cultural historian and politician
Béla Koplárovics (born 1981), Hungarian footballer
Béla Kovács (disambiguation)
Béla Kovács (1910–1980), Hungarian politician and jurist
Béla Kovács (1908–1959), Hungarian politician
Béla Kovács (born 1937), Hungarian clarinetist
Béla Kovács (born 1960), Hungarian politician
Béla Kovács (born 1977), Hungarian footballer
Béla Kuharszki (born 1940), Hungarian footballer
Béla Kun (1886–1937?), Hungarian politician
Béla Lajta (1873–1920), Hungarian architect
Béla Lakatos (born 1984), Hungarian footballer
Béla Linder (1876–1962), Hungarian military officer and politician
Béla Lugosi (1882–1956), Hungarian-American actor
Bela Lugosi, Jr. (born 1938), American lawyer
Béla Macourek (1889–?), Hungarian flying ace
Béla Magyari (born 1949), Hungarian military officer and aerospace engineer
Béla Markó (born 1951), Romanian politician
Béla Mavrák (born 1966), Hungarian tenor singer
Béla Mező (1883–1954), Hungarian sprinter and long jumper
Béla Mezőssy (1870–1939), Hungarian politician
Béla Mikla (1921–?), Hungarian fencer
Béla Miklós (1890–1948), Hungarian military officer and politician
Béla Molnar (1951-2020), American educator
Bela De Nagy (1893–1945), American fencer
Béla Orczy (1822–1917), Hungarian politician
Béla Ormos (1899–1945), Hungarian actor
Béla Pálfi (1923–1995), Serbian footballer
Béla Pállik (1845–1908), Hungarian artist, opera singer and theater director
Bela Papp (born 1994), Finnish figure skater
Béla Pásztor (born 1938), Hungarian politician
Béla Perczel (1819–1888), Hungarian politician and jurist
Béla Perényi (1953–1988), Hungarian chess master
Béla Petrovics, Hungarian sprint canoer
Bela Pratt (1867–1917), American sculptor
Béla Rajki (1909–2000), Hungarian swimming and water polo coach
Béla Rerrich (1917–2005), Hungarian fencer
Béla Réthy (born 1956), German sports reporter
Béla Sárosi (1919–1993), Hungarian football player and manager
Béla Schwalm (born 1941), Hungarian ice hockey player
Béla Scitovszky (1878–1959), Hungarian politician
Béla Sebestyén (1885–1959),  Hungarian footballer
Bela Šefer (fl. 1924), Yugoslav footballer
Béla Serényi (1866–1919), Hungarian politician
Béla Síki (1923–2020), Hungarian pianist
Béla Simon (born 1988), Hungarian rower
Béla Spányi (1852–1914), Hungarian painter
Béla Szabados (disambiguation)
Béla Szabados (1867–1936), Hungarian composer
Béla Szabados (born 1974), Hungarian Olympic swimmer
Béla Szántó (1881–1951), Hungarian politician
Béla Szászy (1865–1931), Hungarian politician and jurist
Béla Székely (1889–1939), Hungarian politician
Béla Szekeres (disambiguation)
Béla Szekeres (born 1933), Hungarian cyclist
Béla Szekeres (1938-2000), Hungarian runner
Béla Székula (1881–1966), Hungarian philatelist and forger
Béla Szende (1823–1882), Hungarian politician
Béla Szepes (1903–1986), Hungarian skier, athlete, graphic designer and journalist
Béla Szőkefalvi-Nagy (1913–1998), Hungarian mathematician
Béla Szombati (born 1955), Hungarian diplomat
Béla Tallián (1851–1921), Hungarian politician
Béla Tarr (born 1955), Hungarian film director
Béla Tomka (born 1962), Hungarian historian
Béla Turi-Kovács, (born 1935), Hungarian politician
Béla Vágó (1881–1939), Hungarian politician
Béla Várady (1953–2014), Hungarian footballer
Béla Varga (disambiguation)
Béla Varga (1888–1969), Hungarian wrestler
Béla Varga (1903–1995), Hungarian politician and priest
Béla Virág (born 1976),  Hungarian footballer
Béla Volentik (1907–1990), Hungarian football player and manager
Béla Vörösmarty (1844–1904), Hungarian jurist and politician
Béla Wenckheim (1811–1879), Hungarian politician
Bela Zaboly (1910–1985), American cartoonist
Béla Zoltán (1865–1929), Hungarian politician and jurist
Béla Zsedényi (1894–1955), Hungarian jurist and politician
Béla Zsitkovszky (1867–1930), Hungarian cinematographer and film director
Béla Zsitnik (born 1924), Hungarian rower
Béla Zsolt (1895–1949), Hungarian author
Béla Zulawszky (1869–1914), Hungarian fencer

See also
Běla, female given name of Czech origin
Adalbert
Vojtěch

Hungarian masculine given names